Ihor Kolyada (born 7 November 1964) is a retired professional Ukrainian football forward.

Koliada became the highest scorer along with Roman Hryhorchuk when in one season when he scored 26 goals for FC Temp Shepetivka during the 1992–93 Ukrainian First League season.

References

External links

1964 births
Living people
Ukrainian footballers
FC Kryvbas Kryvyi Rih players
FC Temp Shepetivka players
FC Kakhovka players
FC Metalurh Zaporizhzhia players
FC Krystal Kherson players
FC Polissya Zhytomyr players
Ukrainian Premier League players
Ukrainian First League players
Ukrainian Second League players

Association football forwards